Oskaloosa High School is a public high school in Oskaloosa, Mahaska County, Iowa, USA. It serves about 700 students. Courses include offerings through William Penn University and Indian Hills Community College. It is at 1816 North 3rd Street in Oskaloosa.

Jeff Kirby is the school's principal. The school has a marching band, jazz band, orchestra, and choir. It is the first high school to have a Pheasants Forever club. There is a Student Council and school newspaper as well as a robotics team.

The Indians are the school mascot and the school has a fight song / battle cry.

Athletics 
The Indians compete in the Little Hawkeye Conference in the following sports:

Baseball
Basketball (boys and girls)
 2019 Boys’ Class 3A State Champion
Bowling
Cross Country (boys and girls)
 Boys' four-time State Champions (1935, 1936, 1938, 1957)
Football
 1996 Class 3A State Champions
Golf (boys and girls)
 Boys' four-time State Champions (1975, 1985, 1993, 1994)
Soccer (boys and girls)
Softball
 2016 Class 4A State Champions
Swimming (boys and girls)
Tennis (boys and girls)
Track and Field (boys and girls)
Volleyball
Wrestling
 2003 Class 3A State Champions

Notable alumni
 Tyler Sash, former defensive back for the Iowa Hawkeyes at the University of Iowa and New York Giants NFL team

See also
List of high schools in Iowa

References

Schools in Mahaska County, Iowa
Public high schools in Iowa